The 1908–09 United States collegiate men's ice hockey season was the 15th season of collegiate ice hockey.

Regular season

Standings

References

1908–09 NCAA Standings

External links
College Hockey Historical Archives

 
College